Heresay is an album by American jazz instrumentalist Paul McCandless recorded in 1988 for Windham Hill Records.  It was re-released in 1988.

Track listing
 "Sojourner" - 8:50
 "Beside A Brook" - 4:53
 "The Marvelous Harlequin Duck" - 3:08
 "Cloudy This Morning" - 5:15
 "Kinesphere" - 2:51
 "Tail Wind" - 6:13
 "Hologram" - 5:15
 "Eyebright" - 6:15
Recorded April 1988, OTR Studios, Belmont, California

Personnel
Paul McCandless - Oboe, English Horn, Soprano Saxophone, Piccolo, Clarinet, Bass Clarinet, Penny whistle, Wind Controller, Synthesizer
Steve Rodby - Acoustic Bass
Trilok Gurtu - Drums, Percussion, Tabla
Wally Kane - Flute, Piccolo Flute, Clarinet, Bass Clarinet
Keith Green - French Horn
Robert Firpo -  Percussion
Art Lande - Piano
Cookie Marenco - Synthesizer

References

1988 albums
Paul McCandless albums